The World in My Pocket is a 1959 thriller novel by the British writer James Hadley Chase.

Film adaptation
In 1961 it was adapted into the French-German film World in My Pocket directed by Alvin Rakoff.

References

Bibliography
 Goble, Alan. The Complete Index to Literary Sources in Film. Walter de Gruyter, 1999.

1959 British novels
Novels by James Hadley Chase
British thriller novels
British novels adapted into films
Robert Hale books